This article refers to crime in the U.S. state of Kentucky.

State statistics
In 2008, there were 122,960 crimes reported in Kentucky, including 198 murders.
In 2020, there were 9,820 violent-crime incidents, and 11,349 offenses reported in Kentucky by 423 law enforcement agencies that submitted National Incident-Based Reporting System data, and covers 99% of the total population.

2010

Capital punishment laws

Capital punishment is applied in this state.

References